Michael Dapaah (born 10 August 1991) is a British actor, rapper, and comedian best known for portraying the fictional rapper Big Shaq (also known as Roadman Shaq). He is also known for his mockumentary SWIL (Somewhere in London), which focuses on four characters and their journey to success.

Early life 
Michael Dapaah was born in 1991 in Croydon, south London, to first-generation Ghanaian immigrants. While he was growing up, his parents wanted him to study science in order to become a doctor, but he was never interested in the subject, instead being more interested in acting and comedy. He also spent time in South Africa as a child. For a time he was in prison. He studied film, acting and theatre at Brunel University and took a course from the National Youth Theatre.

Career
Dapaah began his career by garnering a social following among the British-African community for his brief comedic parts in shows like Meet the Adebanjos, which deals with a Nigerian family in London.

In May 2017 along with friend and fellow Brunel graduate Marv Brown, he launched a mockumentary series on YouTube titled SWIL (Somewhere in London) which amassed over 1 million views in its first series. In this series he created the characters MC Quakez and Big Shaq.

In 2020, Michael Dapaah started making the move to a fitness show called "Belly Must Go".

"Man's Not Hot"
Dapaah saw a rapid growth in public attention when he appeared on Charlie Sloth's BBC Radio 1Xtra show "Fire in the Booth". His comedic rap "Man's Not Hot" (whose backing track was sampled from 67 and Giggs' 2016 track "Let's Lurk") developed into a viral meme, and a studio track version of the song was released on 22 September 2017. The song's music video was released by Dapaah himself on 26 October of the same year; which features cameos from Waka Flocka Flame, Lil Yachty, Dutch rap-group Broederliefde and DJ Khaled, who calls Dapaah's character a "legend".

Discography

Singles

As lead artist

As featured artist

See also
List of British comedians
 Munya Chawawa
Mo Gilligan

References

External links

1991 births
Living people
Black British male rappers
Black British male comedians
Black British male actors
English people of Ghanaian descent
People from Croydon
Rappers from London
UK drill musicians